The Kurtiformes  consist of two extant families of ray-finned fish, the Indo-Pacific Kurtidae (consisting solely of two species in the genus Kurtus) and the much more diverse and widespread Apogonidae (the cardinalfishes). The order is part of the Percomorpha clade and is regarded by many authorities as a sister taxon to the Gobiiformes.

Relationships and defining characteristics
A close relationship between the Kurtidae and Apogonidae was postulated based on the similarity of constituent parts of their dorsal gill arches and that in both groups the eggs have filaments on the micropyle, which enable the eggs to form a mass. This mass is brooded in the mouth in the Apogonidae and borne on the supraoccipital hook of at least one of the two nursery fishes in the Kurtidae. They also have horizontal and vertical rows of sensory papillae on their heads and bodies, which are often arranged in a pattern resembling a grid (similar patterns of sensory papillae can be observed in some species in the Gobiiformes). The two families comprising the Kurtiformes are recovered as sister groups in some molecular phylogenies, but others instead recover them as successive sisters to the Gobiiformes.

Families
Two extant families are classified under the order Kurtiformes:

 Kurtidae (Bleeker, 1859) - nurseryfish
 Apogonidae Günther, 1859 - cardinalfish

References

 
Ray-finned fish orders